Elections to the Himachal Pradesh Legislative Assembly were held in 1998 to elect members of the 68 constituencies in Himachal Pradesh, India. The Indian National Congress  and the Bharatiya Janata Party won an equal number of seats, but the BJP managed to form the government by allying with the Himachal Vikas Congress, and Prem Kumar Dhumal was appointed as the Chief Minister of Himachal Pradesh. The number of constituencies was set as 68 by the recommendation of the Delimitation Commission of India.

Result

Elected members

See also
List of constituencies of the Himachal Pradesh Legislative Assembly
1998 elections in India

References

 State Assembly elections in Himachal Pradesh
1990s in Himachal Pradesh
Himachal